Pestilence is a fictional supervillain appearing in American comic books published by Marvel Comics. The character has battled the Canadian super-team Alpha Flight. The character Pestilence is a literary version of the real life Captain Francis Crozier, R.N., an Ulsterman who was second in command in Franklin's lost expedition to the Northwest Passage and later disappeared after taking command of the expedition from the deceased Franklin.

Fictional character biography
In 1845, F.R. Crozier was appointed doctor and chief science officer for an Arctic expedition led by famed explorer Sir John Franklin, who sought the fabled Northwest Passage; the expedition consisted of two ships, the Terror and the Erebus. Six months after the departure of the expedition, the ships became trapped in the Arctic ice, which never melted; in October 1847, Sir John set forth with a party in search of help and was never seen again. On April 22, 1848, with the stores of food nearly exhausted, Crozier led the remainder of the crew out of the doomed ships and set out over the ice for a 600-miles march to safety. Many of the crew died of exposure during the march and were left unburied, and a number of advance scouts were apparently flash-frozen where they stood; with the remaining crew dying one by one, on the night of 8 May Crozier, desperate to find a way to survive, ingested an elixir he had prepared before, which induced a state of suspended animation that his men mistook for death. His plan was to remain where he fell, allowing the ice to preserve him until the weather warmed enough to revive him, upon which he wouldn't need food or substance; what he had not anticipated was that, out of respect for him and his position, his remaining crew decided to bury him. Interred in permafrost, the sun never reached Crozier and he spent the next 148 years buried alive and going insane.

Nearly a century and a half later, the demigoddess Snowbird was pregnant with her first child. Because of her mystical nature, a place of power was necessary to complete her delivery. Shaman used his power to beseech spirits for aid to lead Alpha Flight to such a place of power and they transported Snowbird there. During the journey they were joined by Shaman's daughter, Talisman.

As the child was being born and Shaman was in the process of binding its life force to Earth, the child's life force and Alpha Flight were subject to a mystical attack. Talisman had been corrupted by her power over the spirits of the Earth and was deeply angry at her father. She told Shaman that she had ordered the spirits he had beseeched to lead him to a place of power that was also a place of death. She had sensed a spirit trapped between life and death and led Alpha Flight there to precipitate the attack on them. She wanted to show Shaman up through his failure to save Snowbird's child, at which time she would step in and bind the attacking spirit. Snowbird's baby was possessed by Crozier, calling himself Pestilence. However, Talisman had fatally miscalculated, because Pestilence had never truly died, thus he was not a spirit and was not subject to her powers. Pestilence attacked Alpha Flight anew and grappled with Talisman, tearing the mystical circlet that was the source and focus of her powers from her head.

Alpha Flight plunged Pestilence through the ice. Emerging from the water, Pestilence tricked Snowbird into assuming the form of Sasquatch, who was in truth one of the Great Beasts. In that form Pestilence was able to take control of her.  He then summoned the spirits of the remaining Great Beasts to the battle. Shaman donned the circlet of power, becoming the new Talisman. He bound the spirits of all the Great Beasts save Snowbird-as-Sasquatch, using her to attack Pestilence directly, forcing him to flee the battle.

Still in possession of Snowbird's child, Pestilence went south, leaving behind him a trail of strange death, until he reached a mining town in Klondike; he was followed by the child's father, Douglas Thompson, who however caught the same incurable plague that killed off the town's population, although he was able to warn Snowbird and Talisman about his location. In an abandoned mine, Alpha Flight again battled Pestilence, until he again seized control of Snowbird in the form of Sasquatch, ordering her to kill him. She did, and Pestilence was released to seek another host body to possess. In trying to keep Snowbird from being possessed, Vindicator slew Snowbird, but was too late, as, after Snowbird's and her family's funeral, Pestilence rose from Snowbird's grave, still in Sasquatch form, and again attacked Alpha Flight. When hard-pressed, Pestilence's spirit tried to possess yet another, but this time Vindicator was able to trap his spirit in the void held within the medicine bag formerly belonging to Shaman.

Recently, it was revealed that Pestilence had found a new host, but he was caught in "some sort of disintegrator blast".

Powers and abilities
Pestilence had a number of supernatural abilities of unknown origin, perhaps deriving from his being buried at a place of power for over a century (Talisman theorized it had something to do with Llan the Sorcerer and his 10,000-year cycle of evil). He had the power to spontaneously generate life forms symbolic of disease and death, including maggots and flies. He could control the spirits of the dead, including those of the great Beasts.

Pestilence could transform his appearance into that of other people, both alive and dead.

Pestilence had the power to generate disease, could cause instantaneous but temporary rapid aging and had the power to draw upon the "bodily decay" of other living beings to rejuvenate himself.

Pestilence had extensive knowledge of chemistry beyond what was commonly known in the 19th Century. His knowledge was such that he could create potions which could induce a deathlike state of suspended animation.

References

External links
 AlphaFlight.Net Alphanex Entry on - Pestilence

Characters created by Bill Mantlo
Comics characters introduced in 1997
Fictional characters based on real people
Marvel Comics characters who are shapeshifters
Marvel Comics characters who use magic
Marvel Comics supervillains